Ong-ard Satrabhandhu is an architect from Thailand. His style is known for linking the classical and traditional architecture languages of East and West. Currently, he is involved in the planning and architectural design of external envelope of “One Nimman” Urban development project in Chiang Mai, Thailand. Ong-ard Satrabhandhu was awarded the renowned Driehaus Architecture Prize in 2020.

Career 
Ong-ard received his B. Arch from Cornell University in 1965 and M. Arch from Yale University in 1967. At Cornell he studied under Colin Rowe.

One of his best known work is Rachamankha. 

The book of his work, "A Tradition of Serenity: The Tropical Houses of Ong-ard Satrabhandhu" was published in 2015.

Gallery

References

External links 
Ong-ard Satrabhandhu named as 2020 Driehaus Prize laureate
Architecture Here and There, The Apotheosis of Ong-ard, May 2017
 Thresholds Journal MIT, Differences, Originality and Assimilation: Building Nine at Panabhandhu School, 2009
 The New York Times, The Struggle to Save Classic Thai Architecture, 2007
 Art 4d, Silence of the Past, February 2000

Driehaus Architecture Prize winners
Ong-ard Satrabhandhu
Ong-ard Satrabhandhu
Living people
1944 births
New Classical architects
Yale School of Architecture alumni
Ong-ard Satrabhandhu